Antti Okkonen (born 6 June 1982) is a former footballer who played in Finland, Sweden, Denmark and Belgium. In addition, he represented the national team. He was a defensive midfielder.

Career
Okkonen started youth career in Oulun Luistinseura. He made his debut on the club's OPS representative team in the second season in 1998. He made his league debut at Myllykoski Pallo in the year 2000. In MyPa's shirt, Okkonen won one Finnish Championship silver and two Finnish Championship bronzes during three seasons (2000-2003).

From Myllykoski, Okkonen moved to Sweden in the team of Landskrona for four (2004-2007) seasons. In the first half of 2007, he was on loan in Silkeborg, Denmark. In January 2008, Okkonen moved to the Belgian RAEC Mons, where he played for one and a half seasons. In August 2009, he returned to MyPa with a contract for the rest of the season, which was extended for two years at the end of the period. For the 2012 season, Okkonen joined the team of the reigning Finnish champion Helsinki Football Club, where he also won the only Finnish championship in his career.

After the championship season, Okkonen moved to the Rovaniemi Football Club, where he would play his final years. He managed to play 6 seasons (2013-2018) in RoPS, during this period he won the Finnish Cup 2013 and two Finnish Championship silver medals in 2015 and 2018. He also served as the team's captain.

During his career in Veikkausliiga, Okkonen played more than 300 matches and played 13 national matches in the Finnish national team. He has also played 18 youth and 56 boys national matches. Okkonen participated in the Finnish team at the 2001 World Championships for under-20s.

After the end of his player career, Antti Okkonen continued his cooperation with the RoPS and currently works as a junior manager and is responsible for the activities of 7-12 year olds.

Career statistics

Achievements

Veikkausliiga 

 Promising player of the year 2001
 Champion 2012
 Runner-up 2002, 2015, 2018
 Third place 2000, 2001
 Finnish Cup 2013

International

Statistics accurate as of match played 25 January 2006

Personal life
Antti is the younger brother of former footballer Jarkko Okkonen.

References

External links
 
 

1982 births
Living people
Finnish footballers
Finland youth international footballers
Finland international footballers
Veikkausliiga players
Belgian Pro League players
Allsvenskan players
AC Oulu players
R.A.E.C. Mons players
Silkeborg IF players
Landskrona BoIS players
Myllykosken Pallo −47 players
Helsingin Jalkapalloklubi players
Finnish expatriate footballers
Finnish expatriate sportspeople in Sweden
Finnish expatriate sportspeople in Denmark
Finnish expatriate sportspeople in Belgium
Expatriate men's footballers in Denmark
Expatriate footballers in Sweden
Expatriate footballers in Belgium
Rovaniemen Palloseura players
Sportspeople from Oulu
Association football midfielders